Siddharth College of Arts, Science and Commerce is a college in Mumbai offering undergraduate and postgraduate courses in Arts, Science, and Commerce fields. The college is affiliated with the University of Mumbai.

History
It was founded on 20 June 1946 by the People's Education Society which was formed by Dr. Babasaheb Ambedkar. It was the first educational institution by the nascent society which was founded nearly a year ago on 8 July 1945 with an aim of affording legal education to all sections of society. The commerce courses became available in 1980.

It is housed in Buddha Bhavan, situated in the Fort area of Mumbai. Its office is located in Anand Bhavan, which has been declared as a heritage structure by the Heritage society of the MMRDA. The building is suscuptible to flooding in heavy Mumbai monsoon.

Over the years, Bharipa's Prakash Ambedkar (Babasaheb's grandson) and Republican Party's Ramdas Athawale – both Ambedkarite factions, but with differing perspectives on socio-political issues – have fought for control over the society and the college.

Courses offered
, the college offered undergraduate coursework in Arts, Science and Commerce Streams. The college also enrolls graduate students in M.Sc. & Ph.D. programs.

Library
The college is also home to some rare books from Dr. Ambedkar's personal collection, which were used as reference for drafting the Constitution of India. The library has on display many Ambedkar artefacts, including a copy of the Constitution of India with his name embossed on it.

Notable people
Dr. Babasaheb Ambedkar

References

Universities and colleges in Mumbai
Affiliates of the University of Mumbai
Educational institutions established in 1946
1946 establishments in India
B. R. Ambedkar